Saint Ann (or Saint Anne, or Saint Anna) was launched at Liverpool in 1797. She made one voyage as a slave ship in the triangular trade in enslaved  people. She foundered or was shipwrecked  or destroyed in 1798 after she had delivered her captives but before she could return to Liverpool.

Enslaving voyage and loss
St Ann first appeared in Lloyd's Register (LR) in 1797.

Captain Robert Jones acquired a letter of marque on 18 September 1797. He sailed from Liverpool on 26 October 1797, and was at Falmouth on 3 November. He acquired captives first at Iles de Los, and then at Cape Grand Mount.

The four vessels had been cruising jointly to find and destroy  "Renaud's Squadron". Daedalus and Hornet destroyed , which Renaud's squadron had captured, and did some damage to the town and fort at Gorée.

On 30 May 1798 Ellis, St Anne, and Pilgrim engaged the French frigate Convention, Captain Roscow, of 32 guns and 200 men. After an exchange of broadsides, the French sailed away.

Saint Ann and Ellis arrived at Barbados around 3 July. On their way they recaptured Hannah, which had been sailing from Mogadore to London when captured.

Saint Ann arrived at St Vincent on 7 July 1798 with 384 captives.

It is not clear when and how Saint Ann was lost. One source states that Captain Robert Jones was lost at sea on this, his seventh voyage as captain of a slave ship, and gives a date of 26 June 1798, but the report of her arrival at St Vincent makes no mention of "late Jones".

Saint Ann had left Liverpool with 70 crew members, and had lost 60 on her voyage.

In 1798, 25 British enslaving vessels were lost. Two were lost on their way back to England. In 1798, 160 vessels sailed from British ports on enslaving voyages, for a 16% loss rate. During the period 1793 to 1807, war, rather than maritime hazards or resistance by the captives, was the greatest cause of vessel losses among British enslaving vessels.

Notes

Citations

References

 
 
 
 
 

1797 ships
Liverpool slave ships
Missing ships
Maritime incidents in 1798